Byåsen Håndball Elite is the women's handball team of the Norwegian multi-sports club Byåsen IL based in Trondheim. The team plays in Eliteserien, the top division in the country, since its promotion in 1982.

The team's first success came as a third division club, when in 1980 it won the silver medal in the national cup. Among its successes are four domestic league and four domestic cup titles, and the club also has a good reputation in the continental arena, having reached the latest stage of the European cup competitions, including the EHF Cup Winners' Cup final in 2007.

Kits

Honours
Norwegian Championship:
Winners: 1984/1985, 1985/1986, 1987/1988, 1988/1989
Norwegian Cup:
Winners: 1988, 1989, 1991, 2007
Finalist: 2006, 2008, 2009
Bronze: 2022/2023
EHF Cup Winners' Cup:
Finalist: 2006/2007

European record 

Incomplete

Team

Current squad
Squad for the 2022–23 season

Goalkeeper
 1  Annick Lipman
 12  Ida Carlson
 16  Helle Kjellberg-Line
Wingers
RW
 22  Ida Marie Kallhovd
 28  Lone Sandvik
LW
 6  Sofie Riseth
 7  Anna Huse
 20  Karen Forseth
Line players
 4  Mathilde Arnstad
 10  Caroline Aar Jakobsen (c)

Back players
LB
 5  Dina Klungtveit Olufsen
 17  Janne Håvelsrud Eklo
 30  Julie Nygård
 31  Kjerstin Boge Solås 
CB
 9  Teodora Tomac
RB
 3  Maria Hjertner
 26  Marie Rokkones Hansen

Retired numbers

2023-2024 Transfers

Joining
  Fride Heggdal Stølen (P) (from  Volda Handball) 
  Aurora Kjellevold Hatle (LB/CB) (from  Fana) 
  Sofie Winther-Hansen (LB) (from  Charlottenlund SK) 
  Josephine Nordstrøm Olsen (GK) (from  Skuru IK) 

Leaving
  Caroline Aar Jakobsen (P) (to  Nykøbing Falster Håndboldklub) 
  Teodora Tomac (CB) (retires)

Technical staff
 Head coach: Valery Putans
 Assistant coach: Ulrich Winther-Hansen
 Goalkeeping coach: Kari Aalvik Grimsbø

Notable former club and National Team players

  Annette Skottvoll
  Karin Pettersen
  Mona Dahle
  Ann-Cathrin Eriksen
  Trine Haltvik
  Kari Solem
  Hege Kristine Kvitsand
  Vigdis Hårsaker
  Kjersti Beck
  Elisabeth Hilmo
  Terese Pedersen
  Kari Aalvik Grimsbø
  Camilla Herrem
  Marit Malm Frafjord
  Gøril Snorroeggen
  Pernille Wibe
  Mari Molid
  Amanda Kurtovic
  Maja Jakobsen
  Tonje Nøstvold
  Marta Tomac
  Emilie Hegh Arntzen
  Marit Røsberg Jacobsen
  Silje Waade
  Moa Högdahl
  Andrea Austmo Pedersen
  Maren Nyland Aardahl 
  Ida Alstad 
  Barbara Arenhart
  Suzana Zuljani
  Iva Zamorska
  Rita Lakatos
  Helena Örvarsdóttir
  Mia Hermansson-Högdahl
  Raja Toumi
  Yeliz Özel
  Patrycja Świerżewska

Notable former club players

  Kate Mogseth
  Camilla Solberg
  Beate Jonassen Grua
  Ingrid Nygård Pedersen
  Sissel Nygård Pedersen
  Marthe Florholmen
  Hilde Stavran Magnussen
  Maren Villabø
  Therese Henden
  Marte Snorroeggen
  Nina Stokland
  Kathrine Hjelmeland
  Gina Lorentsen
  Trine Kambuås
  Guro Rundbråten
  Hanna Yttereng
  June Andenæs
  Inga Berit Svestad
  Maren Gundersen
  Marie Henriksen
  Maria Hjertner
  Tonje Haug Lerstad
  Kristin Venn
  Ida Hernes
  Oda Uthus
  Maja Magnussen
  Anna Bjørke Kallestad
  Julie Bøe Jacobsen
  Melanie Bak

References

External links
 

Norwegian handball clubs
Sport in Trondheim